A by-election was held for the New South Wales Legislative Assembly electorate of The Tumut on 20 August 1866 because the seat of Charles Cowper Jr. had been declared vacant as he was absent from parliament for an entire session.

Dates

Candidates
 Edward Brown was a well known local who had been a pastoralist in the Tumut region since 1846.

 George Thornton was a merchant from Sydney who had previously been the Mayor of Sydney and a member for East Sydney.

Result

Charles Cowper Jr. had been absent from parliament for an entire session and his seat was declared vacant.

See also
Electoral results for the district of Tumut
List of New South Wales state by-elections

References

1866 elections in Australia
New South Wales state by-elections
1860s in New South Wales